Jinchuan may refer to:

 Jinchuan Group (金川集团), mainland Chinese company
 Jinchuan County (金川县), in Ngawa Tibetan and Qiang Autonomous Prefecture, Sichuan
 Jinchuan District (金川区), Jinchang, Gansu
 Jinchuan campaigns, two military campaigns by Qianlong Emperor of Qing Dynasty

Rivers
 Jinchuan River (Nanjing) (金川河), in Nanjing, Jiangsu
 Jinchuan River (Jinchang) (金川河), in Jinchang, Gansu

Towns
 Jinchuan (金川镇), Xingan County, Jiangxi
 Jinchuan (金川镇), Huinan County, Jilin
 Jinchuan (金川镇), Ningxia County, Shaanxi

Townships
 Jinchuan Township (金川乡), She County, Anhui
 Jinchuan Township (金川乡), Tongjiang, Heilongjiang
 Jinchuan Township (金川乡), Ziyang County, Shaanxi
 Jinchuan Township (金川乡), Rui'an, Zhejiang